Barium boride is a hard material with a high melting point. It can be formed by passing a barium vapour at >750 °C over boron crystals:

However, it can also be formed by reacting barium chloride with boron in two stages: firstly at 900 °C for 30 minutes and then at 1,500 °C for 60 minutes.

Potential applications 
Barium boride has been considered as a candidate for use in hot-cathode electron guns.

References 

Barium compounds
Borides